Margoni is a surname. Notable people with the surname include:

Alain Margoni (born 1934), French classical composer
Élisabeth Margoni (born 1945), French actress
Stefano Margoni (born 1975), Italian ice hockey player